4-Hydroxycoumarin is a coumarin derivative with a hydroxy group at the 4-position.

Occurrence
4-Hydroxycoumarin is an important fungal metabolite from the precursor coumarin, and its production leads to further fermentative production of the natural anticoagulant dicoumarol. This happens in the presence of naturally occurring formaldehyde, which allows attachment of a second 4-hydroxycoumarin molecule through the linking carbon of the formaldehyde, to the 3-position of the first 4-hydroxycoumarin molecule, to give the semi-dimer the motif of the drug class. Dicoumarol appears as a fermentation product in spoiled sweet clover silages and is considered a mycotoxin.

4-Hydroxycoumarin is biosynthesized from malonyl-CoA and 2-hydroxybenzoyl-CoA by the enzyme 4-hydroxycoumarin synthase.

Anticoagulants
After the identification of dicoumarol and its anticoagulant activity, it became the prototype for a class of drugs. 4-Hydroxycoumarin forms the core of the chemical structure of anticoagulants known collectively as 4-hydroxycoumarins.  They include, for example, warfarin, a pharmaceutical drug used to prevent formation of blood clots, and brodifacoum, a widely used rodenticide.

See also
Coumarin
Dicumarol

References

4-Hydroxycoumarins